Bobby Lee Olive Jr. (born April 22, 1969) is a former American football wide receiver in the National Football League who played for the Indianapolis Colts. He played college football for the Ohio State Buckeyes. He also played in the Arena Football League for the Buffalo Destroyers/Columbus Destroyers and Carolina Cobras and in the Canadian Football League for the Hamilton Tiger-Cats. Olive was drafted by the Kansas City Chiefs in the eleventh round of the 1991 NFL Draft.

In December 2019, it was announced that Olive would be the inaugural head coach of the Columbus Wild Dogs, an Indoor Football League team in Columbus, Ohio. However, in December 2021, Olive and Wild Dogs management announced they had cut ties with the team's owners.

References

1969 births
Living people
American football wide receivers
Canadian football wide receivers
Indianapolis Colts players
Buffalo Destroyers players
Carolina Cobras players
Columbus Destroyers players
Hamilton Tiger-Cats players
Ohio State Buckeyes football players